The men's 3000 metres steeplechase event at the 1983 Summer Universiade was held at the Commonwealth Stadium in Edmonton, Canada on 6 and 8 July 1983.

Medalists

Results

Heats

Final

References

Athletics at the 1983 Summer Universiade
1983